Massachusetts House of Representatives' 11th Essex district in the United States is one of 160 legislative districts included in the lower house of the Massachusetts General Court. It covers part of Essex County. Democrat Peter Capano of Lynn has represented the district since 2019.

Locales represented
The district includes the following localities:
 part of Lynn
 Nahant

The current district geographic boundary overlaps with that of the Massachusetts Senate's 3rd Essex district.

Former locales
The district previously covered:
 Danvers, circa 1872 
 Wenham, circa 1872

Representatives
 John C. Hoadley, circa 1858 
 George W. Benson, circa 1859 
 Henry Friend, circa 1888 
 Henry Francis Duggan, circa 1920 
 Belden Gerald Bly, Jr., circa 1951-1975 
 Fred A. Hutchinson, circa 1951 
 Thomas M. McGee
 Edward J. Clancy Jr.
 Steven Walsh
 Brendan Crighton
 Peter L. Capano, 2019-current

See also
 List of Massachusetts House of Representatives elections
 Other Essex County districts of the Massachusetts House of Representatives: 1st, 2nd, 3rd, 4th, 5th, 6th, 7th, 8th, 9th, 10th, 12th, 13th, 14th, 15th, 16th, 17th, 18th
 Essex County districts of the Massachusett Senate: 1st, 2nd, 3rd; 1st Essex and Middlesex; 2nd Essex and Middlesex
 List of Massachusetts General Courts
 List of former districts of the Massachusetts House of Representatives

Images

References

External links
 Ballotpedia
  (State House district information based on U.S. Census Bureau's American Community Survey).

House
Government of Essex County, Massachusetts